Old Karasjok Church is a former parish church of the Church of Norway in Karasjok Municipality in Troms og Finnmark county, Norway. It is located in the village of Karasjok. It used to be the main church for the Karasjok parish which is part of the Indre Finnmark prosti (deanery) in the Diocese of Nord-Hålogaland. The Old Karasjok Church is the oldest Lutheran church in Finnmark county, and the only building in the municipality to survive World War II undamaged. The church is no longer regularly used, but it is utilized occasionally for special situations such as weddings.

History
The white, wooden church was built in a cruciform style in 1807 on the basis of designs by the architect Daniel Storch. It served as the main parish church for Karasjok from 1807 until 1974 when the new Karasjok Church was completed. In 1858, the sacristy was enlarged by adding on to the building. Until 1902, the church had a domed turret, but in 1902 a steeple was built to replace the dome.

Media gallery

See also
List of churches in Nord-Hålogaland

References

Karasjok
Churches in Finnmark
Wooden churches in Norway
Cruciform churches in Norway
19th-century Church of Norway church buildings
Churches completed in 1807
1807 establishments in Norway
Millennium sites